Tare weight , sometimes called unladen weight, is the weight of an empty vehicle or container.
By subtracting tare weight from gross weight (laden weight), one can determine the weight of the goods carried or contained (the net weight).

Etymology
The word tare originates from the Middle French word  'wastage in goods, deficiency, imperfection' (15th ), from Italian , from Arabic  , lit. 'thing deducted or rejected', from  'to reject'.

Usage

This can be useful in computing the cost of the goods carried for purposes of taxation or for tolls related to barge, rail, road, or other traffic, especially where the toll will vary with the value of the goods carried (e.g., tolls on the Erie Canal). Tare weight is often published upon the sides of railway cars and transport vehicles to facilitate the computation of the load carried. Tare weight is also used in body composition assessment when doing underwater weighing.

Tare weight is accounted for in kitchen scales, analytical (scientific) and other weighing scales which include a button that resets the display of the scales to zero when an empty container is placed on the weighing platform, in order subsequently to display only the weight of the contents of the container.

See also
Curb weight
 Dry weight
 Gross vehicle weight rating
 Hydrostatic weighing
 Trett (obsolete)

References

 Yam, K. L., "Encyclopedia of Packaging Technology", John Wiley & Sons, 2009, 
 SOLAS: container weighing method 1 & 2

Mass
Containers